Tarun Kant, an institute chair professor at the Indian Institute of Technology Bombay (IIT Bombay) in Mumbai since December 2009, was born on 1 July 1946 in Ballia, Uttar Pradesh, India. He received a BSc degree from Allahabad University in 1962, a B.Tech (Hons.) degree in civil engineering from IIT Bombay in 1967 and an M.Tech in civil engineering, specializing in structural engineering, from the Indian Institute of Technology Kanpur (IIT Kanpur) in 1969. Kant spent about 18 months at a consulting engineering firm in Mumbai before becoming a lecturer at IIT Bombay in January 1971. He received a PhD degree in 1977. Kant became an assistant professor in 1978 and a professor in 1986. At IIT Bombay, he has been a department head (2000–2002), dean of planning (2001–2003) and chair of the Joint Entrance Examination (1998) and the Central Library (1995–1999).

Kant was elected a fellow of the Indian National Academy of Engineering in 1999, the Indian Academy of Sciences in 2004, the Indian National Science Academy (INSA) in 2007 and the National Academy of Sciences, India in 2011. He is the first civil engineer to be elected to all four national academies, and the fourth civil engineer to be elected to the two national science academies (INSA and IASc). Kant has been a visiting professor at the University of Wales, Swansea (1979–82), the University of Cambridge (1993) and the University of California, Los Angeles (2005).

A recipient of the Burmah-Shell Best Paper Prize, he was awarded the 1979 Jawaharlal Nehru Memorial Trust (UK) Scholarship and the 1992-93 European Commission (EC) Senior Faculty Exchange Fellowship by the Government of India. On 13 March 2007, IIT Bombay gave Kant its 2006 Professor H. H. Mathur Award for Excellence in Research in Applied Sciences in recognition of his work in the mechanics of composite materials and structures; he also received the 2009 IIT Roorkee-Khosla National Award for lifetime achievement in the field of engineering. A recipient of the 2010 IIT Bombay Research Paper Award, on 4 April 2012 the institute gave him its 2011 Lifetime Achievement Award.

Kant has published more than 135 research papers in peer-reviewed journals, six chapters in edited books, about 145 papers in conference proceedings, edited four books and serves on the editorial boards of five international journals: Structural Engineering & Mechanics - An International Journal (Techno-Press), the International Journal for Computational Methods in Engineering Science and Mechanics (Taylor & Francis), Computer Modeling in Engineering & Sciences (Tech Science Press), Advances in Civil Engineering (Hindawi Publishing) and the International Journal of Computational Methods (World Scientific). He served a term on the editorial board of Computational Mechanics – An International Journal, has supervised 25 PhD theses and over 75 M.Tech dissertations.

He established a research school of computational structural mechanics at IIT Bombay. Kant served two terms as president of the Indian Society of Theoretical and Applied Mechanics (1999 and 2000), founded the Indian Association for Computational Mechanics (IndACM) and the Indian Association for Structural Engineering (IASE) and organizes the biennial ICCMS (International Congress on Computational Mechanics and Simulation) and SEC (Structural Engineering Convention) congresses in India. He was an INSA-nominated member of the National Committee of International Union of Theoretical & Applied Mechanics (IUTAM) for two three-year terms: July 2000-June 2003 and January 2008-December 2011, and was a member of the IUTAM General Assembly until 2012. Kant is chair and a member of the engineering and technology sections of INSA and IASc, respectively.

Books
 Finite Elements in Computational Mechanics (ed.), Pergamon Press, Oxford, 1985
 Advances in Structural Engineering (co-ed.), Quest Publications, Mumbai, 2000

References

1946 births
Living people
Fellows of the Indian Academy of Sciences
Fellows of the Indian National Science Academy
Fellows of The National Academy of Sciences, India
Academic staff of IIT Bombay
IIT Bombay alumni